Chiloconger is a genus of eels in the family Congridae.

Species
There are currently two recognized species in this genus:

 Chiloconger dentatus (Garman, 1899) (Shortsnout conger)
 Chiloconger philippinensis D. G. Smith & Karmovskaya, 2003

References

Congridae